Hantavirus pulmonary syndrome (HPS) is one of two potentially fatal syndromes of zoonotic origin caused by species of hantavirus. These include
Black Creek Canal virus (BCCV), New York orthohantavirus (NYV), Monongahela virus (MGLV), Sin Nombre orthohantavirus (SNV), and certain other members of hantavirus genera that are native to the United States and Canada.

Specific rodents are the principal hosts of the hantaviruses including the hispid cotton rat (Sigmodon hispidus) in southern Florida, which is the principal host of Black Creek Canal virus. The deer mouse (Peromyscus maniculatus) in Canada and the Western United States is the principal host of Sin Nombre virus. The white-footed mouse (Peromyscus leucopus) in the eastern United States is the principal host of New York virus. In South America, the long-tailed mouse (Oligoryzomys longicaudatus) and other species of the genus Oligoryzomys have been documented as the reservoir for Andes virus.

Signs and symptoms 
Initially, HPS has an incubation phase of 2–4 weeks, in which patients remain asymptomatic. Subsequently, patients can experience 3–5 days of flu-like prodromal phase symptoms, including fever, cough, muscle pain, headache, lethargy, shortness of breath, nausea, vomiting and diarrhea.

In the following 5–7 day cardiopulmonary phase, the patient's condition rapidly deteriorates into acute respiratory failure, characterized by the sudden onset of shortness of breath with rapidly evolving pulmonary edema, as well as cardiac failure, with hypotension, tachycardia and shock. In this phase, patients may develop acute respiratory distress syndrome. It is often fatal despite mechanical ventilation and intervention with diuretics.

After the cardiopulmonary phase, patients can enter a diuretic phase of 2–3 days characterized by symptom improvement and diuresis. Subsequent convalescence can last months to years.

As of 2017, patient mortality in the US from HPS is 36%.

Transmission 

The virus can be transmitted to humans by a direct bite or inhalation of aerosolized virus, shed from stool, urine, or saliva from a natural reservoir rodent. In general, droplet and/or fomite transfer has not been shown in the hantaviruses in either the pulmonary or hemorrhagic forms.

Diagnosis 
The preferred method for diagnosis of Hantavirus Pulmonary Syndrome is serological testing which identifies both acute (IgM) and remote infections (IgG); however, PCR may also be used to identify early infections.

Prevention 
Rodent control in and around the home or dwellings remains the primary prevention strategy, as well as eliminating contact with rodents in the workplace and at campsites. Closed storage sheds and cabins are often ideal sites for rodent infestations. Airing out of such spaces prior to use is recommended. People are advised to avoid direct contact with rodent droppings and wear a mask while cleaning such areas to avoid inhalation of aerosolized rodent secretions.

Treatment
There is no cure or vaccine for HPS. Treatment involves supportive therapy, including mechanical ventilation with supplemental oxygen during the critical respiratory-failure stage of the illness. Although ribavirin can be used to treat hantavirus infections, it is not recommended as a treatment for HPS due to unclear clinical efficacy and likelihood of medication side effects. Early recognition of HPS and admission to an intensive care setting offers the best prognosis.

Epidemiology 
Hantavirus pulmonary syndrome was first recognized during the 1993 outbreak in the Four Corners region of the southwestern United States. It was identified by Dr. Bruce Tempest. It was originally called Four Corners disease, but the name was changed to Sin Nombre virus after complaints by Native Americans that the name "Four Corners" stigmatized the region. It has since been identified throughout the United States.

See also 

 Sweating sickness
 Calabazo virus
 Rockport virus

References

External links 
 "Hantaviruses, with emphasis on Four Corners Hantavirus" by Brian Hjelle, M.D., 2001, Department of Pathology, School of Medicine, University of New Mexico
 Hantavirus Technical Information Index page, US Center for Disease Control
 Viralzone: Hantavirus
 Virus Pathogen Database and Analysis Resource (ViPR): Bunyaviridae
 Hantavirus – Occurrences and deaths in North and South America, 1993–2004, PAHO

Viral respiratory tract infections
Hantavirus infections
Rodent-carried diseases
Biological weapons
Syndromes caused by microbes
Zoonoses